Longitudinal  is a geometric term of location which may refer to:
 Longitude
 Line of longitude, also called a meridian
 Longitudinal engine, an internal combustion engine in which the crankshaft is oriented along the long axis of the vehicle, front to back
 Longitudinal mode, a particular standing wave pattern of a resonant cavity formed by waves confined in the cavity
 Longitudinal redundancy check, in telecommunication, a form of redundancy check that is applied independently to each of a parallel group of bit streams.
 Longitudinal study, a research study that involves repeated observations of the same items over long periods of time — often many decades
 Longitudinal voltage, in telecommunication, a voltage induced or appearing along the length of a transmission medium
 Longitudinal wave, a wave with oscillations or vibrations along or parallel to their direction of travel
 Longitudinal/longitudinally are also anatomical terms of location.

See also
 Latitudinal
 Longitude
 Longitudinal axis (disambiguation)
 Transversality (disambiguation)